The 2020–21 season is FCSB's 73rd season since its founding in 1947.

Previous season positions

Season overview

Players

First team squad

Transfers

In

Out

Overall transfer activity

Expenditure
Summer:   €0,050,000

Winter:   €1,060,000

Total:    €1,110,000

Income
Summer:   €0

Winter:   €13,300,000

Total:    €13,300,000

Net Totals
Summer:   €0,050,000

Winter:   €12,240,000

Total:    €12,190,000

Friendly matches

Competitions

Overview

Supercupa României

Liga I

Regular season

Table

Results summary

Position by round

Results

Cupa României

UEFA Europa League

Qualifying rounds

Statistics

Appearances and goals

Squad statistics

Goalscorers

Goal minutes

Last updated: 7 November 2020 (UTC) 
Source: FCSB

Hat-tricks

(H) – Home ; (A) – Away

Clean sheets

Disciplinary record

Attendances

1Impact of the COVID-19 pandemic on association football

See also

 2020–21 Cupa României
 2020–21 Liga I
 2020–21 UEFA Europa League

Notes and references

FC Steaua București seasons
Steaua
Steaua București